This article contains a list of political parties in France.

France has a multi-party political system: one in which the number of competing political parties is sufficiently large as to make it almost inevitable that in order to participate in the exercise of power any single party must be prepared to negotiate with one or more others with a view to forming electoral alliances and/or coalition agreements.

The dominant French political parties are also characterised by a noticeable degree of intra-party factionalism, making each of them effectively a coalition in itself.

Up until recently, the government of France had alternated between two rather stable coalitions:

 on the centre-left, one led by the Socialist Party and with minor partners such as The Greens and the Radical Party of the Left.
 on the centre-right, one led by The Republicans (and previously its predecessors, the Union for a Popular Movement, Rally for the Republic) and the Union of Democrats and Independents.
This was the case until the 2017 presidential election, when Emmanuel Macron of the centrist La République En Marche! defeated Marine Le Pen of the right-wing National Rally in the second round. This was the first time in which a third party had won the presidency, as well as the first time that neither of the major coalitions had appeared in the second round of a presidential election. This was followed shortly by a significant victory for LREM in the 2017 legislative election, winning a majority of 350 seats. Both the traditional coalitions suffered major defeats.

In the 2022 presidential election, the same scenario repeated, with Emmanuel Macron being again victorious. Both traditional parties (Socialist Party and The Republicans) scored less than 5% each, with Jean-Luc Mélenchon's La France Insoumise emerging as the dominant left-wing party, ranking third in the first round.

The National Rally (previously known as the National Front before a name change in 2018) has also experienced significant successes in other elections. Since 2014, the party has established itself as a major party in France, finishing in first place in the 2014 and 2019 European elections as well as in the 2015 local elections, though the party failed to win government in any regions due to the last-ditch alliance between the centre-left and the centre-right coalitions in Hauts-de-France and Provence-Alpes-Côte d'Azur.

Elected parties

Major nationwide represented parties

Other nationwide represented parties

Regional parties with national representation

Region-only parties

Non-elected parties

French Revolution 
 Jacobin Club (Centre-left to left-wing)
 Girondist (Centre-left)
 Maraisards (Syncretic)
 Montagnards (Radicalism)
 Cordeliers Club (Left-wing to far-left)
 Hébertistes (Far-left)
 Feuillants Club
 Enragés (Far-left)
 Monarchiens (Centre to centre-right)
 Club de Clichy (Right-wing)
Bonapartists (1815)

Historical parties
 Bonapartists (1815, 1851–1889)
 Socialist Party of France (1902)
 French Socialist Party (1902)
 French Socialist Party (1919)
 Socialist Party of France – Jean Jaurès Union
 French Section of the Workers International
 Democratic Republican Alliance
 Union of the Democratic Forces (1958–1960)
  (PAPF; 1927–1939)
  (PRAS; 1936–1940) 
  (1945–1951)

Political parties in French overseas possessions 
 List of political parties in French Guiana
 List of political parties in French Polynesia
 List of political parties in Guadeloupe
 List of political parties in Martinique
 List of political parties in Mayotte
 List of political parties in New Caledonia
 List of political parties in Reunion
 List of political parties in Saint Barthélemy
 List of political parties in the Collectivity of Saint Martin
 List of political parties in Saint-Pierre and Miquelon
 List of political parties in Wallis and Futuna

Historical parties
 French India Socialist Party 
 Mahé Socialist Party

See also 

 Liberalism and radicalism in France
 Lists of political parties

Notes

References 

 
France
 
Political parties
France